Etters Beach (2016 population: 30) is a resort village in the Canadian province of Saskatchewan within Census Division No. 11. It is on the west shore of Last Mountain Lake in the Rural Municipality of Big Arm No. 251.

History 
Etters Beach incorporated as a resort village on October 1, 1965.

Government 
The Resort Village of Etters Beach is governed by an elected municipal council and an appointed clerk. The mayor is Erin Leier and its clerk is Denise Brecht.

Parks and recreation
Etters Beach  Recreation Site Campground is located adjacent to the village. The recreation site features 12 daily rental campsites serviced with 30-amp electricity and water plus 29 seasonal campsites. There's also a large area with un-electrified campsites. All campsites have a view of Last Mountain Lake. The beach area offers sandy beaches, swimming, boating, and fishing.

On the south side of the village is 9-hole golf course called Etters Beach Golf Club.

North of Etters Beach, at the north end of Last Mountain Lake, is Last Mountain Lake Bird Sanctuary, the oldest bird sanctuary in North America.

Demographics 

In the 2016 census conducted by Statistics Canada, the Resort Village of Etters Beach recorded a population of 30 living in 13 of its 114 total private dwellings, a  change from its 2011 population of 30.

See also 
List of communities in Saskatchewan
List of municipalities in Saskatchewan
List of resort villages in Saskatchewan
List of villages in Saskatchewan
List of summer villages in Alberta

References

External links 

Resort villages in Saskatchewan
Big Arm No. 251, Saskatchewan
Division No. 11, Saskatchewan